Dane Belton (born December 7, 2000) is an American football safety for the New York Giants of the National Football League (NFL). He played college football at Iowa.

Early life and high school
Belton grew up in Tampa, Florida and attended Jesuit High School. Belton was rated a three-star recruit and committed to play college football at Iowa from over 25 scholarship offers.

College career
Belton played in eight games with four starts during his freshman season. As a sophomore, he had 33 tackles with 1.5 tackles for loss, one sack, five passes broken up, and one forced fumble. Belton was named first-team All-Big Ten Conference as a junior after recording 46 tackles with three tackles for loss and breaking up seven passes with five interceptions. After the end of the season, he declared that he would be entering the 2022 NFL Draft.

Professional career

Belton was drafted by the New York Giants with the 114th pick in the fourth round of the 2022 NFL Draft. On August 1, 2022, Belton broke his collarbone during training camp. In Week 10 against the Houston Texans, Belton recorded his first career interception on quarterback Davis Mills in the 24-16 win.

References

External links
 New York Giants bio
Iowa Hawkeyes bio

Living people
2000 births
Iowa Hawkeyes football players
American football safeties
Players of American football from Tampa, Florida
New York Giants players